Khanqah Sirrajia (Ding Khola) (Chashma (PAEC COLONY)) Airport is located near Kundian in the Punjab, Pakistan. Presently, no airline serves this airport. It is only used by VVIP passengers who arrive there via government helicopter. The airport is on the Pakistan Civil Aviation Authority map and any plane can use it during an emergency. It was also used by the International Atomic Energy Agency inspectors who visited the atomic facility. In 2015, when a PAF plane crashed in this region, an Army Cobra helicopter landed on this facility to transport the dead bodies.

Facilities

See also 
 Airlines of Pakistan
 List of airports in Pakistan
 Transport in Pakistan

References

Airports in Punjab, Pakistan